The African Window is a building in Pretoria, Gauteng, which houses the Ditsong National Museum of Cultural History (DNMCH) of South Africa. The DNMCH was amalgamated with the Pretoria-based Transvaal Museum for Natural History (now the Ditsong National Museum of Natural History and the South African National Museum of Military History (situated in Johannesburg) (now the Ditsong National Museum of Military History on 1 April 1999 to form the Northern Flagship Institution. In April 2010 the new name was launched, and the NFI became Ditsong Museums of South Africa. Ditsong is managed by a chief executive officer and a board, which replaced the three separate previous museum boards.

The collection of the museum includes objects such as excavated archaeological material and artworks, historical documents, archives, various current and historical audiovisuals, Stone Age, Iron Age and historic archaeology sites, historical buildings, and early domesticated animals.

Gallery

External links

 Ditsong Official Website
 360 degree Virtual Tour of the National Cultural History Museum

History museums in South Africa
Archaeological museums in South Africa
Museums in Pretoria